Century Downs Racetrack and Casino is a casino and horse racing track near Calgary. It is one of two "A-level" horse racing venues in the province of Alberta and brought live horse racing back to the Calgary area for the first time since June 15, 2008. Century Downs offers live Standardbred races on weekends and holidays throughout the months of April to November. The casino features 550 slot machines, seven VLTs, and an Off-Track Betting area which simulcasts both Standardbred and Thoroughbred races from around the world.  Dining facilities include a lounge and the Mid City Grill restaurant.  

Century Downs first opened on April 1, 2015. Its first day of Standardbred racing was on April 25, 2015.

See also
List of casinos and horse racing tracks in Alberta

References 

Harness racing venues in Canada
Horse racing venues in Canada
Casinos in Alberta
Casinos completed in 2015
2015 establishments in Alberta
Rocky View County